Rockdale is the name of several places:

Australia
 Rockdale, New South Wales
 City of Rockdale, the former local government area in New South Wales

United Kingdom
Rockdale, County Tyrone, a townland in County Tyrone, Northern Ireland

United States
 Rockdale County, Georgia
 Rockdale, Illinois
 Rockdale, Indiana
 Rockdale, Kentucky
 Rockdale (Fallston, Maryland), a home on the National Register of Historic Places
 Rockdale, New York
 Rockdale, Pennsylvania
 Rockdale Township, Pennsylvania
 Rockdale, Texas
 Rockdale, Washington
 Rockdale, Wisconsin